Benito Raman (born 7 November 1994) is Belgian professional footballer who plays as a forward for Belgian club Anderlecht.

Career

Youth
At the age of 4 he started playing football at Cercle Melle. He stayed there for six months. In 2001, at a local tournament organised by KFC Semmerzake, Raman was named the best player of the tournament. This caught the attention from Gent.

Gent
After eight years playing in Gent's youth teams, Raman made his debut against Zulte Waregem, replacing Tim Smolders in the 91st minute. In February 2012, Raman chose to stay in Ghent, despite reported interest from Inter Milan, Aston Villa and Hoffenheim.

Standard Liège
On 27 July 2016, Raman signed a four-year deal with Standard Liège.

Fortuna Düsseldorf
On 31 August 2017, Raman was lent to Fortuna Düsseldorf until 2018. 

In January 2018, the loan was extended by another season until summer 2019. 

In March 2018, Fortuna Düsseldorf announced they had exercised the option to sign Raman permanently on a contract until 2022, for a fee of around €1.5 million.

Schalke 04
On 5 July 2019, Raman joined Schalke 04 on a five-year contract, for a fee of around €6.5 million.

International career
Raman was born in Belgium and is of Spanish descent.

He represented Belgium as a youth international at every age group from the under-17's to the under-21's.

On 9 September 2019, Raman made his debut for the senior Belgium national team, coming on as a 90th minute substitute against Scotland in a Euro 2020 qualifier that saw Belgium run out 4–0 winners at Hampden Park.

Career statistics

Club

International

Honours
Gent
Belgian Pro League: 2014–15
Belgian Super Cup: 2015

Fortuna Düsseldorf
2. Bundesliga: 2017–18

References

External links
 
 

1994 births
Living people
Footballers from Ghent
Belgian footballers
Association football forwards
Belgium international footballers
Belgium youth international footballers
Belgium under-21 international footballers
Belgian people of Spanish descent
K.A.A. Gent players
Beerschot A.C. players
K.V. Kortrijk players
Sint-Truidense V.V. players
Standard Liège players
Fortuna Düsseldorf players
FC Schalke 04 players
R.S.C. Anderlecht players
Belgian Pro League players
Bundesliga players
2. Bundesliga players
Belgian expatriate footballers
Belgian expatriate sportspeople in Germany
Expatriate footballers in Germany